The 2019–20 Odense Boldklub season was the club's 131st season, and their 58th appearance in the Danish Superliga. As well as the Superliga, the side is also competing in Sydbank Pokalen.

They ended up as 7th in the league, and losing the European Play-off final against AGF.

First team

Last updated on 30 June 2020

Transfers and loans

Transfers in

Transfers out

Transfer summary

Spending

Summer:  3,000,000 DKK

Winter:  0,000,000 DKK

Total:  3,000,000 DKK

Income

Summer:  8,250,000 DKK

Winter:  10,000,000 DKK

Total:  18,250,000 DKK

Net Expenditure

Summer:  5,250,000 DKK

Winter:  10,000,000 DKK

Total:  15,250,000 DKK

Loans in

New contracts

Friendlies

Pre-season

Winter

Post corona

Competitions

Superliga

League table

Results summary

Results by round

Matches

Relegation round

European play-offs

Quarter-finals 

Odense won 4–2 on aggregate.

Semi-finals 

Odense won 4-2 on aggregate

Final

Sydbank Pokalen

Squad statistics

Goalscorers
Includes all competitive matches. The list is sorted by shirt number when total goals are equal.

Disciplinary record

References

Odense Boldklub
Odense Boldklub seasons